Venieri is a surname. Notable people with the surname include:

 House of Venier
 Marco Venieri (disambiguation), multiple people
 Lydia Venieri (born 1964), Greek artist